The Cayman Islands competed in the 2002 Commonwealth Games in Manchester, England from 25 July – 4 August 2002. A team of 8 athletes in 3 sports represented the country.

Medallist

Athletics

The athletics team consisted of two athletes.

Men
Track & road events

Field Events

Women
Track & road events

Key
Note–Ranks given for track events are within the athlete's heat only
Q = Qualified for the next round
q = Qualified for the next round as a fastest loser or, in field events, by position without achieving the qualifying target
NR = National record
N/A = Round not applicable for the event

Shooting

Three shooters were included in the final squad.

Men

Swimming

Three swimmers were included in the final squad.

Men

Women

References

Nations at the 2002 Commonwealth Games
Cayman Islands at the Commonwealth Games